Sebastián Pozo (born 7 April 1951) is a Spanish racing cyclist. He rode in the 1977 Tour de France.

References

External links
 

1951 births
Living people
Spanish male cyclists
Place of birth missing (living people)
Sportspeople from the Province of Málaga
Cyclists from Andalusia